Gorki may refer to:
Gorki Águila (b. 1968), Cuban rock musician
Gorki (band), a Belgian band of Luc De Vos
Gorki (Kazan Metro), a station of the Kazan Metro, Kazan, Russia
Gorki Ridge, a ridge in Antarctica
Gorki, Russia, several inhabited localities in Russia
Horki, a town in Belarus

See also
Górki (disambiguation), several locations in Poland
Gorky (disambiguation)
Horki (disambiguation)